

The Campaign to Bring Back British Rail is a UK pressure group with the object of completing the renationalisation of British Rail, which was privatised in the 1990s. In addition to its representation of ordinary passengers, on whose behalf it campaigns for improvements to rail services, it undertakes research for the purpose of lobbying political parties towards the ends of reintroducing a vertically-integrated, publicly owned and operated British railway network. It has over 150,000 supporters UK wide, accumulated since it was founded in 2009, and is managed from two hubs - in Glasgow and London.

In 2022, the Scottish Government brought the main Scottish operator into public ownership as ScotRail Trains.

Feedback
A 2012 poll showed that 70% of voters want a re-nationalisation of the railways, while only 23% supported continued privatisation. According to a 2013 YouGov poll, 66% of the public support bringing the railways into public ownership. According to the Office of Rail and Road, as of 2016 there was 62% support for public ownership of train-operating companies. A poll of 1,500 adults in Britain in June 2018 showed 64% support renationalising Britain's railways, 19% would oppose renationalisation and 17% did not know.

See also
Financing of the rail industry in Great Britain
Impact of the privatisation of British Rail

References

External links 
 Official website

Organizations established in 2009
British Rail
Rail transport in Great Britain
Transport advocacy groups of the United Kingdom
2009 establishments in the United Kingdom